Richard Thomas De George (born 1933) is an American philosopher and University Distinguished Professor of Philosophy, of Russian and East European Studies, and of Business Administration, and Co-Director of the International Center for Ethics in Business at the University of Kansas. He is a former president of the Metaphysical Society of America (1983).

References

20th-century American philosophers
Philosophy academics
1933 births
Presidents of the Metaphysical Society of America
Living people
Yale University alumni
University of Kansas faculty